Tenable, Inc. is a cybersecurity company based in Columbia, Maryland. It is known as the creator of the vulnerability scanning software Nessus.

History
Tenable was founded in 2002 as Tenable Network Security, Inc. The original co-founders of Tenable were Ron Gula, Jack Huffard, and Renaud Deraison. In 2012, Tenable received its first round of institutional funding in the form of $50 million from the venture capital firm Accel Partners. In 2017, the company was renamed Tenable, Inc. Its initial public offering (IPO) took place on the Nasdaq on July 26, 2018.

Acquisitions
In 2016, Tenable acquired the cybersecurity company FlawCheck. In 2019, Tenable paid $78 million to acquire the Israel-based operational technology company Indegy Ltd.

In April 2022, Tenable announced plans to acquire an attack surface management software startup, Bit Discovery, for $45 million in cash. The acquisition was expected to close in the second quarter of 2022.

References

External links

American companies established in 2002
Security companies of the United States
Technology companies of the United States
Companies based in Columbia, Maryland
Computer security companies